Charles Rory Mallinson (October 27, 1913 – March 26, 1976) was an American film and television actor.

Career
Born in Atlanta, Georgia, Mallinson began his acting career after signing a contract with Warner Brothers in 1945. That year he had a small role in the film, Pride of the Marines, starring John Garfield and Eleanor Powell. Mallinson continued making films through the 1940s, and throughout the 1950s, appearing in over 90 films during this period.

Notable films in which he performed include: a featured role in the 1947 film noir Dark Passage, starring Humphrey Bogart and Lauren Bacall; Mighty Joe Young (1949); the Abbott and Costello vehicle, Abbott and Costello Meet the Invisible Man (1951); the 1952 western, Springfield Rifle, starring Gary Cooper; and Howard Hawks' 1952 film, The Big Sky, which stars Kirk Douglas, Dewey Martin, and Elizabeth Threatt. In the early 1950s, he also had a featured role in the film serial, Blackhawk.

His final performance in the film industry was in the western, Westbound (1959), starring Randolph Scott and Virginia Mayo.

Death
Mallinson died on March 26, 1976, in Los Angeles, aged 62, from undisclosed causes.

Filmography

(Per AFI database)

 Pride of the Marines  (1945) as Doctor
 Cloak and Dagger  (1946) as Paul (uncredited)
 Two Guys from Milwaukee  (1946) as Movie Ticket Taker (uncredited)
 Cry Wolf  (1947) as Becket
 Dark Passage  (1947) as George Fellsinger
 Deep Valley  (1947) as Foreman (uncredited)
 King of the Bandits (1947) as Henchman Burl
 Nora Prentiss  (1947) as Fleming
 Possessed  (1947) as Coroner's Assistant
 Road to the Big House  (1947) as Fred
 That Way with Women  (1947) as Man on Grandstand (uncredited)
 For You I Die  (1947) as Patrolman Mac
 Berlin Express  (1948) as MP Guard on Second Train (uncredited)
 Blonde Ice  (1948) as Police Sgt. Benson (uncredited)
 The Checkered Coat  (1948) as Perkins
 The Denver Kid  (1948) as Jason Fox
 Docks of New Orleans  (1948) as Thompson
 Fighter Squadron  (1948) as Guard (scenes deleted)
 He Walked by Night  (1948) as Detective with Harry (uncredited)
 The Hunted  (1948) as Arizona Highway Patrolman (uncredited)
 I Wouldn't Be in Your Shoes  (1948) as Harry – 1st Detective
 Last of the Wild Horses  (1948) as Henchman Hank Davis
 Open Secret  (1948) as Chuck Hill
 Panhandle  (1948) as Sheriff Jim
 El Dorado Pass  (1948) as Sheriff Tom Wright
 Wake of the Red Witch  (1948) as Officer (uncredited)
 Bad Men of Tombstone  (1949) as Desert Sheriff
 Angels in Disguise  (1949) as Martin Lovell
 Flaxy Martin  (1949) as Coroner Intern (uncredited)
 Mighty Joe Young  (1949) as 3rd Bartender (uncredited)
 Prince of the Plains  (1949) as James Taylor
 Rim of the Canyon  (1949) as Sheriff Pat (uncredited)
 Roseanna McCoy  (1949) as A Hatfield (uncredited)
 South of Rio  (1949) as Captain Dan Brennan
 Sword in the Desert  (1949) as Harris (uncredited)
 Task Force  (1949) as Jerry Morgan (uncredited)
 Trapped  (1949) as Agent Charles (uncredited)
 A Woman's Secret  (1949) as Police Lt. Benson (uncredited)
 California Passage  (1950) as Wounded Stage Driver (uncredited)
 County Fair  (1950) as Grattan
 The Damned Don't Cry  (1950) as Johnny Enders (uncredited)
 Salt Lake Raiders  (1950) as Sheriff
 Short Grass  (1950) as Jim Westfall
 Three Secrets  (1950) as Reporter (uncredited)
 Abbott and Costello Meet the Invisible Man  (1951) as Tough Guy at Bar (uncredited)
 According to Mrs. Hoyle  (1951) as Detective
 Fingerprints Don't Lie  (1951) as Brad Evans
 Fort Dodge Stampede  (1951) as Sheriff
 Fourteen Hours  (1951) as Cop (uncredited)
 Purple Heart Diary  (1951) as Capt. Sprock
 Rodeo King and the Senorita  (1951) as Sheriff Baxter
 Three Desperate Men  (1951) as Ed Larkin
 You're in the Navy Now  (1951) as Lieutenant Commander (uncredited)
 The Redhead and the Cowboy  (1951) as Carson (uncredited)
 Oh! Susanna  (1951) as Vern Davis – Scout (uncredited)
 Cavalry Scout  (1951) as Corporal
 The Cimarron Kid  (1952) as Deputy (uncredited)
 Carson City  (1952) as Crewman (uncredited)
 Deadline – U.S.A.  (1952) as Rienzi's Associate (uncredited)
 Hellgate  (1952) as Banta
 Laramie Mountains (1952) as Paul Drake – Henchman, aka Bill Turner
 Montana Belle  (1952) as Great Dalton
 Scorching Fury  (1952) as J.D., the sheriff
 The Sniper  (1952) as Police Lineup Organizer (uncredited)
 Springfield Rifle  (1952) as Barfly (uncredited)
 Waco  (1952) as Crawford
 A Yank in Indo-China  (1952) as Prof. William Marlow
 The Big Sky  (1952)
 Brave Warrior  (1952) as Barker
 Bandits of Corsica  (1953)
 Cow Country  (1953) as Tim Sykes
 The Great Jesse James Raid  (1953) as Cavalry Officer (uncredited)
 Killer Ape  (1953) as Perry
 Safari Drums  (1953) as Murphy (uncredited)
 The Man Behind the Gun  (1953) as Sgt. Riley (uncredited)
 The Human Jungle  (1954) as Passerby (uncredited)
 Jesse James vs. the Daltons  (1954) as Bob Ford
 Killer Leopard  (1954) as Deevers
 The Lone Gun  (1954) as Townsman (uncredited)
 Playgirl  (1954) as Hotel Doorman (uncredited)
 A Bullet for Joey  (1955) as Rent-a-Car Clerk (uncredited)
 One Desire  (1955) as Mr. Gray (uncredited)
 Wichita  (1955) as Robber #3 (uncredited)
 Seminole Uprising  (1955) as Toby Wilson
 Kentucky Rifle  (1955) as Indian Chief
 Shotgun  (1955) as Frank
 The Helen Morgan Story  (1957) as Pageant Reporter (uncredited)
 Shoot-Out at Medicine Bend  (1957) as Townsman (uncredited)
 Spoilers of the Forest  (1957) as Timber Cruiser (uncredited)
 The Law and Jake Wade  (1958) as Deputy (uncredited)
 The Notorious Mr. Monks  (1958) as Veterinarian (uncredited)
 King of the Wild Stallions  (1959) as Sheriff Cap Fellows
 Westbound  (1959) as Hotel Clerk (uncredited)

References

External links
 
 

1913 births
1976 deaths
20th-century American male actors
American male film actors
American male television actors
Male actors from Atlanta